The  Asian Baseball Championship was the 21st installment of the tournament. The championship took place at Xinzhuang Baseball Stadium in Taipei County (now New Taipei City), Republic of China (Taiwan, competing as Chinese Taipei). Chinese Taipei national baseball team won the competition for the fourth time in the competition's history.

Top four

See also
 List of sporting events in Taiwan

References

B
2001
2001 in baseball
Sport in New Taipei